Party on the Dancefloor is the second live album released by pop group Steps. The album was recorded during the band's Party on the Dancefloor Tour. The album was released in June 2018.

Track listing 
"Scared of the Dark" - 7:34
"Deeper Shade of Blue" - 4:20
"Chain Reaction" - 4:31
"Happy" - 3:38
"Stomp" 7:13
"Better Best Forgotten" / "Last Thing on My Mind" (Medley) - 6:01
"No More Tears (Enough Is Enough)" / "No More Tears on the Dancefloor" (Medley) - 5:48
"Dancing with a Broken Heart" - 4:41
"When I Said Goodbye" - 4:14
"5,6,7,8" - 6:42
"Better the Devil You Know" - 5:34
"It's the Way You Make Me Feel" - 7:03
"Heartbeat" - 6:05
"Story of a Heart" - 3:55
"Summer Of Love" / "Paradise Lost" / "Despacito" (Medley) - 5:54
"Neon Blue" - 5:59
"Love U More" / "You'll Be Sorry" / "After the Love Has Gone" / "Love's Got a Hold on My Heart" (Medley) - 9:46
"One for Sorrow" - 6:33
"Tragedy" - 8:22

Charts

Release history

References 

2018 live albums
Steps (group) albums